Miss Universe Thailand 2015, the 16th Miss Universe Thailand pageant was held at Royal Paragon Hall, Siam Paragon in Bangkok on July 18, 2015. Forty entrants from countrywide camped in Ubon Ratchathani before flying back to Bangkok for the final stage. Since this year, Miss Universe Thailand has gotten the license of Miss Earth again.

The final round was broadcast live on Channel 3. The 2015 pageant was the first time ever that Miss Universe Thailand used the same format as Miss Universe pageant; Top 15 (Swimsuit competition), Top 10 (Evening gown competition), and Top 5 (Final questions and final look). 

Pimbongkod Chankaew, as the deputy of Miss Universe Thailand 2014, crowned Aniporn Chalermburanawong  (a representative from Lampang) at the end of the event. Aniporn Chalermburanawong went on to represent Thailand at the Miss Universe 2015 competition in Las Vegas, United States. 1st Runner-Up Chavika Watrsang represented Thailand in Miss Earth 2015 held in Vienna, Austria.

Results
Color keys

Special Awards

Order of announcement

Top 15
 Ravinnipa
 Cassandra
 Chavika
 Phureeras
 Sureeporn
 Chonnanee
 Chatchadaporn
 Benjarat
 Parichat
 Chachurat
 Asanee
 Warisa
 Aniporn
 Anchalika
 Alisa

Top 10
 Asanee
 Warisa
 Aniporn
 Ravinnipa
 Phureeras
 Chavika
 Anchalika
 Alisa
 Parichat
 Chatchadaporn

Top 5
 Anchalika
 Chatchadaporn
 Ravinnipa
 Aniporn
 Chavika

Regional audition
 North-east region, 30 May 2015
 North region, 6 Jun 2015
 South region, 7 Jun 2015
 Central region, 13-14 Jun 2015

Delegates 
40 delegates have been confirmed. The information from Miss Universe Thailand Official website

Withdraw 
 #10 Phattaramalin Nasawasd, (Kalasin) withdrew after announcing Top 40 due to personal reason, and replaced by Tunchanok Kangnikorn, ( Sing Buri)
 #26 Nattanankarn Reejinda, ( Trat) withdrew due to sickness during camping in Ubon Ratchathani, no new delegate replaced

Notes 
 #9 Parichat Bunyuen competed in Miss Thailand Universe 2011, but did not place and Miss Thailand World 2014, where she placed at Top 10 and won Miss Photogenic award.
 #15 Ammika Marnalor competed in Miss Thailand Universe 2011, but did not place and Miss Thailand 2012, where she placed at Top 10.
 #20 Patcharada Monthathip competed in Miss Universe Thailand 2014, but did not place.
 #26 Nattanankarn Reejinda competed in Miss Universe Thailand 2012, but did not place.
 #40 Cassandra Haller competed in Miss Thailand World 2010, but did not place.

Judges 
Telecast Judges:
 Supaphan Pichaironnarongsongkram
 Petcharakorn Watcharapongsanitwong Na Ayudhya
 Panya Vichinthanasan
 Auendoo Disakula Na Ayudhya
 Sudarat Burapatchaisri
 Prissana Sukheepoj
 Viluck Lhothong
 Jitlada Disayanand
 Chalita Yaemwannang — Miss Universe Thailand 2013
 Jirayu Tangsrisuk

References

External links
 Miss Universe Thailand Official website

2015
2015 in Bangkok
Universe Thailand
Beauty pageants in Thailand
July 2015 events in Thailand